Nakrekal Assembly constituency is a SC (Scheduled Caste) reserved constituency of the Telangana Legislative Assembly, India. It is one of 12 constituencies in the Nalgonda district. It is part of Bhongir Lok Sabha constituency.

Chirumarthi Lingaiah of Indian national congress is currently representing the constituency.

Mandals
The Assembly Constituency presently comprises the following Mandals:

Members of Legislative Assembly

Election results

Telangana Legislative Assembly election, 2018

Telangana Legislative Assembly election, 2014

See also
 Nakrekal
 List of constituencies of Telangana Legislative Assembly

References

Assembly constituencies of Telangana
Assembly constituencies of Nalgonda district